Dawda Camara Sankharé (born 4 November 2002) is a Spanish professional footballer who plays as a forward for Spanish club Girona FC.

Club career
Born in Banyoles, Girona, Catalonia, Camara joined Girona FC's youth setup in 2014, from UE Porqueres. He made his senior debut with the reserves on 10 January 2021, coming on as a late substitute for Adrián Turmo in a 0–0 Tercera División home draw against Cerdanyola del Vallès FC.

Camara scored his first senior goal on 5 September 2021, netting the B's second in a 2–1 away win over CE L'Hospitalet. He made his first team debut on 8 November, replacing Jordi Calavera late into a 1–2 away loss against CD Tenerife in the Segunda División championship.

International career
Born in Spain, Camara is of Mauritanian descent. He was called up to the Mauritania national team for matches in June 2022.

Personal life
Camara's older brother Sile was also a footballer. He mainly represented CD Banyoles, UE Figueres and UE Llagostera before becoming a manager; the duo also worked together at Porqueres.

References

External links
 
 

2002 births
Living people
People from Pla de l'Estany
Sportspeople from the Province of Girona
Spanish footballers
Spanish people of Mauritanian descent
Spanish sportspeople of African descent
Footballers from Catalonia
Association football forwards
Segunda División players
Tercera División players
Tercera Federación players
Girona FC B players
Girona FC players